The Royal, Celestial and Military Order of Our Lady of Mercy and the Redemption of the Captives (abbreviated O. de M.), also known as the Mercedarians, is a Catholic mendicant order established in 1218 by Peter Nolasco in the city of Barcelona, at that time the capital of the Principality of Catalonia, part of the Crown of Aragon, for the redemption of Christian captives. Its members are most commonly known as Mercedarian friars or nuns. One of the distinguishing marks of the Order of the Blessed Virgin Mary of Mercy is that, since its foundation, its members are required to take a fourth vow: to die, if necessary, for another who is in danger of losing their faith. The Order exists today in 17 countries.

General background 
Between the eighth and the fifteenth centuries, medieval Europe was in a state of intermittent warfare between the Christian kingdoms of southern Europe and the Muslim polities of North Africa, Southern France, Sicily and Moorish portions of Spain. According to James W. Brodman, the threat of capture, whether by pirates or coastal raiders, or during one of the region's intermittent wars, was a continuous threat to residents of Catalonia, Languedoc and the other coastal provinces of medieval Christian Europe. Raids by militias, bands and armies from both sides were an almost annual occurrence.

For over 600 years, these constant armed confrontations produced numerous war prisoners on both sides. Islam's captives were reduced to the state of slaves since they were considered war booty. In the lands of Visigothic Spain, both Christian and Muslim societies had become accustomed to the buying and selling of captives, so much so that tenth-century Andalusian merchants formed caravans to purchase slaves in Eastern Europe. In the thirteenth century, in addition to spices, slaves constituted one of the goods of the flourishing trade between Christian and Muslim ports.

Starting before the First Crusade, many hospices and hospitals were organized by the chapters of cathedrals or by the monastic orders. Within the communal organizations of towns, local charitable institutions such as almshouses were established by confraternities or guilds, or by successful individual laymen concerned with the welfare of their souls.

Broader-based and aristocratically-funded charitable institutions were more prominent, and the episodes of aristocratic and even royal ransom and its conditions, were the subject of chronicle and romance. The knights of the original Order of St John—the Knights Hospitaller—and the Templars in their origins are well known, and the impact of their organized charity upon the religious values of the High Middle Ages.

Peter Nolasco 

Sources for the origins of the Mercedarians are scant and almost nothing is known of the founder, Peter Nolasco. A narrative developed between the 15th and early 17th centuries that culminated in Nolasco's canonization as a saint in 1628.

All the biographers agree that, at some point in his youth, Nolasco became concerned with the plight of Christians captured in Moorish raids and that he decided to establish a religious order to succor these unfortunates. Nolasco began ransoming Christian captives in 1203. After fifteen years of work, he and his friends saw that the number of captives was growing day by day. His plan was to establish a well-structured and stable redemptive religious order under the patronage of Blessed Mary.

Foundation of the Order 

The Order of the Blessed Virgin Mary of Mercy (or the Order of Merced, O.Merc., Mercedarians, the Order of Captives, or the Order of Our Lady of Ransom) was one of many dozens of associations that sprang up in Europe during the 12th and 13th centuries as institutions of charitable works. The work of the Mercedarians was in ransoming impoverished captive Christians (slaves) held in Muslim hands, especially along the frontier that the Crown of Aragon shared with al-Andalus (Muslim Spain).

The Order of Mercy, an early 13th century popular movement of personal piety organized at first by Nolasco, was concerned with ransoming the ordinary men who had not the means to negotiate their own ransom, the "poor of Christ."

Hagiographical origins
From the year 1192 certain noblemen of Barcelona had formed a confraternity for the purpose of caring for the sick in hospitals, and also for rescuing Christian captives from the Moors.  Tradition has it that around 1218, Nolasco and King James I of Aragon experienced separately a vision of the Virgin Mary, who asked them to found a religious order dedicated to rescuing the many Christian captives held by the Muslims. Nolasco's confessor, Raymond of Penyafort, a Dominican friar and former canon of Barcelona, encouraged and assisted him in this project; and King James also extended his protection.

On August 10, 1218, the new religious order for the Redemption of Captives was officially constituted at the main altar erected over Eulalia of Barcelona's tomb in the Cathedral of the Holy Cross (also known as the Cathedral of Santa Eulalia) in Barcelona. Bishop Berenguer de Palou gave Nolasco and his companions the white religious habit that they would wear as characteristic of the Order; he put them under the Rule of Saint Augustine as a norm for their life in common and he gave his authorization for the sign of his cathedral, the Holy Cross, to be on the habit of the Order. After that, Nolasco and the first Mercedarians made their religious profession there before the bishop. Their headquarters was the Monastery of St. Eulalia of Barcelona, which served as the first Mercedarian convent and as a house of welcome for redeemed captives.

Documentary records
Reconstructing the Order's beginnings from the documentary record produces a far less detailed story. In this, the year 1218 plays no role. The founder first appears ca. 1226 as a collector of alms in Perpignan. By 1230 he was collecting alms for captives in Barcelona as the head of a small lay confraternity. On August 12, 1230, Maimó Gombal, a resident of Barcelona and a man of some property, directed in his will that 100 Papal States scudi be handed over to Nolasco for the ransoming of captives. The bequest was not unusual, either in amount or intent, for Catalans of this era frequently included this pious good work in their testaments. What sets this particular bequest apart is that it contains the first notice of the redeeming work of Nolasco. Nothing is known about him before his appearance in Maimó's will and only very little afterwards.

During the next six years, the confraternity slowly evolves into a religious order, as members obtain properties in Catalonia. While Nolasco, by all accounts, first established his movement at Barcelona and then on Mallorca, its first acquisitions of note were in the Kingdom of Valencia. Here special circumstances associated with the frontier —an abundance of new land awaiting Christian settlement and an arena for
the practice of charitable ransoming— created an ideal environment for the new Order. Consequently, the preponderance of what Mercedarians came to possess here were lands donated by the king, successful crusaders and other patrons.

In 1236, Pope Gregory IX granted the Mercedarians formal recognition as a religious order under the old Rule of St. Augustine. The small order gained additional members, property and support in the 1250s and 1260s. While evidence is scant, one has to assume that this support came in recognition of the Order's work in ransoming captives in a war zone that remained quite active.  The growing pains, however, also caused institutional turmoil, whose outlines can only be glimpsed. The visible result was a reorganization in 1272 by a new master, Pere d'Amer.
 
James I, whose descendants claimed him to be the Mercedarian founder, had in fact no documented contact with the Order until the late 1230s and early 1240s, at which time he granted formerly Muslim lands in Valencia, especially the Shrine of Santa Maria del Puig, patron saint of the kingdom. It was not until the 1250s that royal patronage becomes evident, when the king granted the Order his guidaticum (a form of diplomatic protection), economic privileges that promoted gifts to the Order, and, at least temporarily, the important shrine of St. Vincent in the City of Valencia. Claims by King James II and Peter IV of a royal foundation of the Order reflected not real history but their own designs upon the Order's financial resources and personnel.

Constitutions of the Mercedarian Order

In the preface of the first Constitutions of the Mercedarian Order of 1272, three key elements referring to the foundation stand out: the name, the founder and the purpose of the Order.

The name with which the Order founded by Nolasco is identified, is mentioned first. Prior to the 1272 Constitutions, the Order had several names among which: Order of Saint Eulalia, Order of the Mercy of Captives, Order of the Redemption of Captives, Order of Mercy. Those of 1272 established a dual patronage: The Order of the Virgin Mary of the Ransom of Captives of St. Eulalia of Barcelona. But the proper and definitive title is: Order of the Virgin Mary of Mercy of the Redemption of Captives. This name, however, does not come into general use until the 1290s and is not codified until the Albertine Constitutions of 1327.

The 1272 Constitutions, further, establish Nolasco as the Order's founder:he has been constituted "servant, messenger, founder and promoter" of the new Institute. Peter Nolasco is the real founder of the Order or the "Procurator of the alms of captives" as defined on March 28, 1219, by the first document referring to him.

Finally, it is clearly specified that the purpose of the Order is "to visit and to free Christians who are in captivity and in power of the Saracens or of other enemies of our Law… By this work of mercy… all the brothers of this Order, as sons of true obedience, must always be gladly disposed to give up their lives, if it is necessary, as Jesus Christ gave up his for us."

Reform 

In the 15th century, a movement grew up among the monasteries of the Order seeking a stricter lifestyle, keeping more exactly the Rule of St. Augustine under which the friars live. This spread and gained approval by the Master General of the Order. As a result of the Counter-Reformation, spurred by the Council of Trent (1545-1563), this goal was revived and further developed by Friar John Baptist of the Blessed Sacrament.

A small community of friars were allowed to open their own monastery under the leadership of Friar John Baptist in 1603. Adopting a simpler form of life and of their religious habit and wearing only sandals, they became known as the Mercedarian Recollects, later as Discalced Mercedarians. They were approved as a semi-autonomous branch of Order by Pope Gregory XV in 1621. They eventually separated and became a fully independent Order.

The fourth vow 

Some orders and congregations add particular vows, besides the three vows of religion.

These additional vows are part of the nature of the profession of each order and are permitted by the church. They can be solemn or simple, perpetual or temporary. The Fourth Vow of the Order of Mercy is a Solemn Vow. In accordance with the general principle of a vow, it is an act of the will and an authentic promise, in which the reason for the vow is perfection. It also presupposes a sincere will of obligation in conscience and by virtue of the community.

Fourth vow in the various constitutions
In the First Constitutions of the Order, the American Constitutions (1272): "... all the brothers of the Order must always be gladly disposed to give up their lives, if it is necessary, as Jesus Christ gave up His for us..."
The Albertine Constitutions (1327): "Chapter 28: Surrender of one’s life as hostage in Saracen Territory."
The Zumelian Constitutions (1588): "I will be obedient to you and your successors up to death; and I will remain in person in the power of the Saracens if it be necessary for the Redemption of Christ’s Faithful."
The Madrilene Constitutions (1692) and the Roman Constitutions (1895): "Therefore, we must understand in the first place, that all our religious are committed to the Redemption of Captives in such a way that they must not only always be disposed to carry it out in fact if the Order sends them, but also to collect alms, or if the prelates do select them, to do whatever else may be necessary for the act of redemption to be carried out."
Also in the Madrilene Constitutions: "We declare that this vow is essential because it inseparably constitutes our Order in its nature and substance by virtue of the early institution… and our predecessors have always professed and fulfilled it."
The Constitutions and Norms (1970): "The Mercedarian, urged by Charity, dedicated himself to God by a particular vow in virtue of which he promises to give his own life, if it will be necessary, as Christ did for us, to free from the new forms of slavery the Christians who are in danger of losing their Faith."
The Aquarian Constitutions (1986): "In order to fulfill this mission we, impelled by love, consecrate ourselves to God with a special vow, by virtue of which we promise to give up our lives, as Christ gave his life for us, should it be necessary, in order to save those Christians who find themselves in extreme danger of losing their faith by new forms of captivity."

Our Lady of Ransom 

Eventually a feast day was instituted and observed on September 24, first in the religious order, then in Spain and France, and on February 22, 1696 Pope Innocent XII extended it to the entire church. The Mercedarians keep this day as a first class feast, with a vigil, privileged Octave and Proper Office under the title: Solemnitas Descensionis B. Mariæ V. de Mercede.

Patronage
Our Lady of Ransom is the principal patron of Barcelona; the proper Office was extended to Barcelona (1868) and to all Spain (second class, 1883). Sicily took up the old date of the feast (Sunday nearest to August 1) by permission of the Roman Congregation of Rites of August 31, 1805.
 
In England, Our Lady of Ransom is also venerated as “Our Lady of the Dowry” in the context of a revival of devotion to her “to obtain the rescue of England as Our Lady's Dowry”, i.e., to reverse England's formal separation from the Roman Catholic Church and restore papal supremacy.

In the Philippines, particularly Mercedes, Catbalogan, Roman Catholics have been devoted to Nuestra Señora de las Mercedes as their principal patroness, often invoked for protection against Moro raiders.

See also 
 Scapular of Our Lady of Ransom
 Our Lady of Mercy
 Trinitarian Order
 Santa Maria della Mercede e Sant'Adriano a Villa Albani, Rome

References

Further reading 
 Murúa, Martín de, Historia General del Pirú, orígen y descendencia de los Incas...  Ms. 1616.
 Remón, Alonso, Historia General de la Orden de Nuestra Señora de la Merced Redención de Cautivos...  (2 Vols.), Madrid 1618, 1633.
 Vargas, Bernardo de, Chronica Sacri et Militaris Ordinis Beatae Mariae de Mercede Redemptionis Captivorum (2 Vols.), Palermo 1619, 1622.
 Molina, Tirso de (Pseud. Fr. Gabriel Téllez), Historia general de la orden de Nuestra Senora de las Mercedes (2 Vols.), (Ms.1636, 1639), Madrid 1973, 1974.
 Salmerón, Marcos, Recuerdos históricos y políticos..., Valencia 1646.
 Vázquez Núñez, Fr. Guillermo, Manual de historia de la Orden de Nuestra Señora de la Merced. Tomo I, Toledo 1931.
 Pérez Rodriguez, Fr. Pedro Nolasco, Historia de las misiones mercedarias en América, Madrid 1966.
 Brodman, James William: Ransoming Captives in Crusader Spain: The Order of Merced on the Christian-Islamic Frontier, Pennsylvania 1986.
 García Oro, José / Portela Silva, Maria José, Felipe II y la Reforma de las Ordenes Redentoras, in: Estudios 200-201 (1998), 5-155.
 Taylor, Bruce, Structures of Reform. The Mercedarian Order in the Spanish Golden Age, Leiden 2000, ; 9789004118577.
 León Cázares, María del Carmen, Reforma o extinción: Un siglo de adaptaciones de la Orden de Nuestra Señora de la Merced en Nueva España, México 2004, .
 Mora González, Enrique, Fe, Libertad, Frontera. Los rescates de la Merced en la España de Felipe II (Redenciones 1575, 1579 y 1583) (Diss.Pontifica Universitá Gregoriana Rom 2012).
 Nieländer, Maret, The Mercedarian Order in the Andes in the sixteenth century, Heidelberg 2019.

External links 
 Homepage for the Order of Our Lady of Mercy in the United States
Homepage of the Mercedarian Order (in Spanish)

 
1218 establishments in Europe
Christian religious orders established in the 13th century